The 1925 Spring Hill Badgers football team was an American football team that represented Spring Hill College, a Jesuit college in Mobile, Alabama, during the 1925 college football season. In its first season under head coach William T. Daly, the team compiled a 4–4 record.

Schedule

References

Spring Hill
Spring Hill Badgers football seasons
Spring Hill Badgers football